Tim Cartmell is a martial artist best known as an author and translator of martial arts books. He is an Eighth Degree Black Belt (Master) in Kung-Fu San Soo, and a Black Belt in Brazilian Jiu-Jitsu. He placed first at the 2003 IBJJF Pan Championship as a brown belt (Senior 2), and first at the 2004 IBJJF Pan Championship as a black belt (Senior 2).

Publications 
 Principles, Analysis, and Application of Effortless Combat Throws Publisher: Unique Publications (August 1998)  or 0865681767
 Xing Yi Nei Gong: Xing Yi Health Maintenance and Internal Strength Development by Dan Miller, Tim Cartmell; Publisher: Unique Publications (October 1998) 
 A Study of Taijiquan by Sun Lutang, Tim Cartmell (Translator), Publisher: North Atlantic Books (June 2003), 
 A Detailed Analysis of the Art of Seizing and Locking by Zhao Da Yuan, Translated by Tim Cartmell
 The Method of Chinese Wrestling by Tong Zhongyi, Tim Cartmell (Translator), Publisher: North Atlantic Books (November 9, 2005) 
 "Standing Grappling: Escapes and Counters" DVD December 2006
 "Traditional Sun Style Taijiquan" by Tim Cartmell, Troyce Thome, Publisher: Learning Solutions; 1 edition (September 17, 2010)

References

External links
 Shen Wu Martial Arts

Living people
Martial arts writers
American practitioners of Brazilian jiu-jitsu
Year of birth missing (living people)
Place of birth missing (living people)